Thiruvaiyaru Panchapakesa Rajalakshmi (11 November 1911 – 1964) fondly called as 'Cinema Rani T.P.R' was an Indian actress, first female director of South India, filmmaker, singer, producer & social reformist. She is the first Tamil and Telugu film heroine, first South Indian female director, screenplay writer, singer, music director and producer. 

Her work Miss Kamala was a revolutionary movie that conveyed a strong woman equality message to society. It was the first Tamil feature film to be directed by a woman film director. The film made Rajalakshmi the first female director in South India and the second in India. In addition to producing and directing the film, she wrote, edited and composed the music for the film. Miss Kamala movie was based upon T.P.R's novel- Kamalavalli allathu Doctor Chandrasekaran. This novel book was re-released recently by K.Balachandar.

Rajalakshmi was the first heroine in the South Indian Cinemas to have had a Rasigar Manram (Fans Association) that was formed by Rajalakshmi's core Fans.

Rajalakshmi was awarded the Kalaimamani award in 1964. Dr.MGR sent his own car to Rajalakshmi's home & picked her up to felicitate her to the awarding venue.

Family 
T.P. Rajalakshmi has only one biological daughter  named Mrs. Kamala Mony. T.P. Rajalakshmi inaugurated the birth year of her daughter- Kamala by naming the movie Miss Kamala

T. Rajalakshmi's grandson is Mr.S.Raghavan and daughter-in-law is Vijayalakshmi Raghavan.

T.P.Rajalakshmi's great-grandsons & great daughter-in-law are Suma Subramania, Subramanian Raghavan and Dr. Harish Raghavan.

Rajalakshmi also saved a girl child named Mallika from female infanticide, which was practiced in those days. Rajalakshmi took care of the girl, educated her & brought her up.

Early life 
T. P. Rajalakshmi was born on 11 November 1911 in the town of Saliyamangalam in the then Tanjore district of the Madras Presidency. As a child, she was married at the age of 11, but the child marriage did not last. As her family was unable to pay dowry, Rajalakshmi was sent back to her mother's house in very few days after the child marriage commenced. Rajalakshmi along with her parents moved to Trichy in poverty. Rajalakshmi, as a child, had an excellent singing talent & acting talent. Rajalakshmi used to sing any kinds of songs as soon as hearing and act instantly upon seeing & observing the story. This special quality of Rajalakshmi was recognized by 'Sankaradas Swamigal' and Rajalakshmi joined in Sankaradas Swamigal's Drama Atriste troupe & performed the lead role in Pavalakkodi & all stage plays of Sankaradas Swamigal.

At the age of 20, Rajalakshmi fell in love and married her co-star T. V. Sundaram. T.P. Rajalakshmi gave birth to her only biological daughter in 1936 named "Kamala". T. P. Rajalakshmi also directed a film named Miss Kamala and inaugurated the birth year of her daughter Kamala. The movie Miss Kamala turned out to be a hit of those days and Rajalakshmi was a leading star of those days, which made the people to expect and wait anxiously for her upcoming movies. Rajalakshmi established her own production company named "Sri Rajam Talkies" and she produced her films from her own production company- Rajam Talkies.

Rajalakshmi acted in several stage plays showing protest against the British government, who were ruling over India in those days, which made Rajalakshmi to be imprisoned several times by the British Government.

In addition, Rajalakshmi supported & took care of several people who came seeking help. Rajalakshmi's house were always filled with people who came in search of help. Rajalakshmi encouraged everyone to stay with her in her house as a family. Rajalakshmi was a role model for the people of those days and she initiated social awareness to fight against the Female Child Assassination and to fight for the Freedom of the Nation through her lifestyle that she led.

Rajalakshmi was well appreciated by Dravidian Leaders. EVR Periyaar visited Rajalakshmi at her home in Rajarathinam street & appreciated Rajalakshmi's contributions to the society. It is also notable that Periyaar addresses Rajalakshmi as Thangachi (meaning Sister in Tamil)- says Mrs.Kamala- daughter of T.P.Rajalakshmi in one of the press interviews.

Rajalakshmi owned several properties at Kilpauk and became a wealthy woman. She resided at the Palace house, that she purchased at the very first. TPR also permitted her brothers and their families too to reside at her palace "Raj Mahal" that was located at No. 1 Rajarathnam street. soon after, she owned several properties in Rajarathnam Street and Professor Subramanian street Vasu Street etc. at Kilpauk. As a wealthy woman, she continued her roles in several films and she had a strong welcome by the people for her movies and songs. Indhiya Thaai was her last film. Rajalakshmi passed away on 20 August 1964 because of Low Blood Pressure.

Stage career 
In order to support her family, Rajalakshmi joined a drama troupe and acted in stage plays. She learnt dance and music from Sankaradas Swamigal, a popular dramatist. Rajalakshmi got her big break in 1931, when she was cast as the heroine in the first Tamil talkie, Kalidas. Later on, Rajalakshmi turned out to be the star cast of those days. Many directors and producers requested Rajalakshmi to provide her call sheet for the upcoming films.

She was honored with the title "Cinema Rani" and later, she was awarded the "Kalaimamani" award (1961–62) for her excellence towards the Cine Industry, for which Dr. M.G. Ramachandran, who later became the Chief Minister, honoured T. P. Rajalakshmi by sending his own car to Rajalakhmi's house in order to invite the pioneer to the venue, where Rajalakshmi was facilitated and awarded.

As a novelty, Rajalakshmi introduced a sequence in which a song is heard over the radio. It was a period when radio was not yet a familiar medium of entertainment.

Rajalakshmi employed stunt sequences to portray the kidnapping of the heroine by a hired gang for which she engaged well known stunt actors of the day – 'Battling' C. S. D. Singh and 'Stunt' Rajoo.

In addition of being a First Lady Director & producer of South Indian Cinemas, T.P. Rajalakshmi also holds a historic record of being the First Heroine of Tamil Films. Movie: Kalidas is the first Talkie film of South India & T.P. Rajalakshmi is the heroine of Kalidas movie. The movie reel of Kalidas was brought to the theatres as a procession by Tamil audiences in Chennai. All along the way, people lit Agarbathis and broke coconut, welcoming the Film Reel of the First Talkie movie starring their favourite Cinema Rani T.P. Rajalakshmi. Kalidas is a movie that showed the audience that 'MOVIES CAN SPEAK'. All the films that were released before Kalidas movie were Silent Movies. Also it is noted that before Rajalakshmi turned out to be a Heroine, male actors used to disguise as Women actors and act in movies for the heroine roles.

A staunch patriot, Rajalakshmi was associated with the Freedom Movement and the Indian National Congress. To express her devotion to the cause, she produced a film, India Thai. The British Indian censors objected to the title of the film, but TPR never minded the protest and she released the film daring in the name of the Indhiya Thaai. Heavily mauled by the censors, this film fared badly at the box office but she did not mind the loss for her, rather she felt it was her contribution to the Freedom Movement.

She later switched to matronly roles in movies such as Idhaya Geetham. Rajalakshmi became wealthy, owning sizeable properties in Kilpauk. In one of her movies, Nandakumar, T. P. Rajalakshmi objected to wearing a "katcham" (a bra-like costume). Noted star Durga Khote wore it for the Marathi version without a murmur of protest. However, Rajalakshmi threatened to walk out of the movie, and left with no option, a 1930s – Poona-fashion "jumper" blouse was used for the replacement of the katcham.

When T.P.R was staying at a hotel for her film shoot, Kumari Rukmini (Actress Lakshmi's mother) was staying on the next room where TPR stayed. Kumari Rukmini along with her parents met the star-Rajalakshmi & expressed Rukmini's interests & passion to act in movies. T.P.R recommended Rukmini for the film & Rukmini's film acting career thus begun. Similarly, when T.P.R visited Madurai for her film shoot, playback singer T.M. Soundarrajan visited T.P. Rajalakshmi as a courtesy call & asked for a singing chance.

T.P.R acted many films with V.A. Chellappa, T.R. Mahalingam, N.S. Krishnan, M.G. Chakrapani (brother of actor and former CM of Tamil Nadu- Dr. M.G.R). The combination of T.P.R & V.A. Chellappa was a super-hit expectation of the audiences and fans.

Other leading stars like Sandhya (Mother of Ms. J. Jayalalithaa), Sivaji Ganesan, Padmini, Savithri, Gemini Ganesan, M.G.R, T.R. Mahalingam, M.N. Nambiar and others from the film industry of those days had a great respect for T. P. Rajalakshmi, and the entire South Indian Film Industry of those days were so proud for T.P. Rajalakshmi's achievements and contributions for the development of Tamil Cinemas.

Recognition and legacy 

T.P. Rajalakshmi was awarded the Kalaimamani award in 1964. Dr.MGR sent his own car to Rajalakshmi's home & picked her up to felicitate her to the awarding venue.

T.P. Rajalakshmi's birth centenary was celebrated by the Government of Tamil Nadu. The Former Chief Minister of Tamil Nadu, J.Jayalalitha  stated, "Tamil Nadu feels pride in gifting to the Indian Cinemas, the first female director, producer and heroine honored with the title – CINEMA RANI T. P. Rajalakshmi". Her birth centenary was celebrated recently as a Government Function to honor the pioneer.

The Nadigar Sangam of South India / South Indian Artistes Association led by Actor Nassar, Poochi Murugan, Vishal & Karthi Sivakumar honored TPR by constituting an award in her name (T .P .Rajalakshmi award) for the forthcoming generations in the 63rd Annual General Body Meet. Veteran Actress M. N. Rajam was the first recipient to receive the T. P. Rajalakshmi award.

Several other recognition were conducted by the Tamil Nadu Iyal Isai Naadagam Mandram, Ulagaayutha Tamil Talkies, Barathi Tamil Foundation. Smt. Kamala was honored in behalf of Cinema Rani TPR.

Actor Sivakumar during his speech at TPR's centenary celebration said- 'The magnitude of T.P. Rajalakshmi's achievement in becoming Southern Cinema's first woman Director-Producer is perhaps best demonstrated by the fact that Southern Cinema got its next Woman Film Director only after 17 years, when Bhanumathi directed Sandirani movie'

Sun TV honored Cinema Rani TPR on the occasion of the World women's day by organizing a show named Penmayai Potruvom.

Star Vijay TV honored Cinema Rani TPR in Neeya Naana show, hosted by Gopinath.

Podhigai TV conducted a special star cast interview of Cinema Rani T. P. R's daughter- Kamala along with veteran Cine Actor, Mohanraman in the show named Muthal Thiruppam.

T.P. Rajalakshmi was a social reformist who supported Dravidian movement and women empowerment. She conveyed good social messages and morals to people through her films & stage plays. She was a revolutionary film artist who fought for the freedom. She sung patriotic songs against British in her stage plays and was imprisoned by the British government several times for doing so, she conveyed social awareness messages through her films and stage plays against Sati, female infanticide & favouritism towards a particular caste or religion. She was a brave woman to make her mark in the Cine Industry. Her community deserted her for stepping into the Cinema Industry. Rajalakshmi was separated away by her community. However, that didn't stop Rajalakshmi to continue her contributions to the society and film industry.

Filmography 

Source:

References

External links 
 
 
 
 
 
 
 – a song from the film Paranjothi (1945)

1911 births
1964 deaths
Tamil actresses
Tamil film directors
People from Thanjavur district
Indian women film directors
20th-century Indian film directors
20th-century Indian businesspeople
20th-century Indian actresses
Indian women film producers
Indian film actresses
Actresses in Tamil cinema
Actresses in Telugu cinema
Film directors from Tamil Nadu
Film producers from Tamil Nadu
Actresses from Tamil Nadu
Businesswomen from Tamil Nadu
20th-century Indian businesswomen